Ashton is a small town in the Western Cape in South Africa. The town is at the foot of the Langeberg mountain range, 10 km southwest of Montagu and 19 km east-southeast of Robertson. It is situated in a  valley known for production of wines and fruit.

Ashton is known for its two canning factories, which boost its tourism. Ashton is also home to various tourist attractions, including vineyards and steam locomotives.

History 
It was established in 1897 on the Roodewal farm and attained municipal status in January 1956. The town was named after the first station-master.

References

Populated places in the Langeberg Local Municipality
Populated places established in 1897